The Tephritid Workers Database is a web-based database for sharing information on tephritid fruit flies. Because these species are one of the most economically important group of insect species that threaten fruit and vegetable production and trade worldwide, a tremendous amount of information is made available each year: new technologies developed, new information on their biology and ecology; new control methods made available, new species identified, new outbreaks recorded and new operational control programmes launched. The TWD allows workers to keep up-to-date on the most recent developments and provides an easily accessible and always available resource.

History 
A group of scientists involved in tephritid fruit fly research and management launched the Tephritid Workers Database in May 2004,
 with the support of the Insect Pest Control Section of the Joint FAO/IAEA Centre. The Tephritid Workers Database is self-maintained by the participants and its development depends on the active contribution of the members.

The TWD database has now more than 1000 members from more than 100 countries and is sponsoring or hosting websites of other regional fruit fly working groups:
 The Tephritid Workers of Europe Africa and the Middle East (TEAM)
 The Tephritid Workers of the Western Hemisphere (TWWH)
 The Tephritid Workers of Asia Australia and Oceania (TAAO)

Fruit Fly News 
In the past, an information service for the tephritid fruit fly workers called FRUIT FLY NEWS (FFN) was issued annually under the auspices of the International Biological Program and then under the International Organisation of Biological Control (IOBC). This newsletter publication was interrupted in 1992 and then resumed in an electronic format since 2009. The first issues tell all the story about the creation of FFN and the Working Group on Fruit Flies (WGFF).
 International Biological Program (IBP) Fruit Fly News n°1 (1972)
 Fruit Fly News n°2 (1973)
 IBP Fruit Fly News n°3 (1974)
 IOBC/WPRS WG Rhagoletis cerasi Fruit Fly News n°4 (1977)
 IOBC/WPRS WG Fruit Flies of Economic Importance Fruit Fly News n°5 (1979)
 IOBC/WPRS WG Fruit Flies of Economic Importance Fruit Fly News n°6 (1981)
 FFN #7_1983
 FFN #8_1985
 FFN #9_1987
 FFN #10_1989
 FFN #11_1992

Follow the link to get all Fruit Fly News issues.

Insect Pest Control Newsletters 
 IPC newsletters

Tephritid Workers of Europe Africa and the Middle East Newsletters 
 TEAM newsletters

Tephritid Workers of Asia Australia and Oceania Newsletters 
 TAAO newsletters

Previous Symposia of the International Fruit Fly Workers 
Initiated in 1982 at the First International Symposium held in Athens, the quadrennial fruit fly symposium for the international fruit fly workers is being well established now with a large number of scientists from all over the world attending the symposium.
 The First International Symposium on Fruit Flies of Economic Importance, Athens, Greece, 16–19 November 1982Proceedings
 The Second International Symposium on Fruit Flies of Economic Importance, Crete, Greece, 16–21 September 1986Proceedings
 The Third International Symposium on Fruit Flies of Economic Importance, Antigua, Guatemala, 14–20 October 1990Book presentation
 The Fourth International Symposium on Fruit Flies of Economic Importance, Sand Key, Florida, USA, 5–10 June 1994Book presentation)
 The Fifth International Symposium on Fruit Flies of Economic Importance, Penang, Malaysia, 1–5 June 1998Proceedings
 The Sixth International Symposium on Fruit Flies of Economic Importance, Stellenbosch, South Africa, 6–10 May 2002 Proceedings
 The Seventh International Symposium on Fruit Flies of Economic Importance, Salvador, Bahia, Brazil, 10–15 September 2006. Proceedings.
 The Eight International Symposium on Fruit Flies of Economic Importance, Valencia, Spain, 26 September–1 October 2010. Proceedings
 The Ninth International Symposium on Fruit Flies of Economic Importance, Bangkok, Thailand, 12 to 16 May 2014. Book of Abstracts Proceedings
 The Tenth International Symposium on Fruit Flies of Economic Importance, Tapachula, Chiapas, Mexico, 23 to 27 April 2018. (website)

Tephritid Fruit Flies of Economic Importance 
According to White & Elson-Harris (1992), there are about 70 species of fruit flies that are considered important agricultural pests.
See The Diptera Site for full information.
Bactrocera, Anastrepha, Ceratitis, Rhagoletis, and Dacus are the most important genera.
The most important pest species of Tephritidae are:
 Bactrocera dorsalis

 Bactrocera cucurbitae

 Bactrocera oleae

 Bactrocera tryoni

 Bactrocera zonata
 Bactrocera invadens
 Ceratitis capitata (Distribution map)
 Anastrepha fraterculus
 Anastrepha ludens
 Anastrepha obliqua
 Rhagoletis pomonella
 Rhagoletis cerasi
 Dacus ciliatus

References

Further reading 
 Cavalloro, R. (ed.) (1986). Fruit Flies of Economic Importance 84: Proceedings of the Cec/Iobc AD Hoc Meeting, Held in Hamburg, on 23 August 1984. Rotterdam: A. A. Balkema. 224p. 
 Cavalloro, R. (ed.) (1989). Fruit flies of economic importance 87. Proceedings of the CEC/IOBC International Symposium, Rome, April 7–10, 1987. Rotterdam: A. A. Balkema. 640 p. 
 Robinson, A. S. & Hooper, G. (eds.) (1989). Fruit flies. Their biology, natural enemies, and control, Vol. 3(B). Amsterdam: Elsevier Science Ltd. 448 p. 
 Vijaysegaran, S. & Ibrahim, A. G. (eds.) (1991). First International Symposium on Fruit Flies in the Tropics, Kuala Lumpur, 1988. Malaysian Agricultural Research and Development Institute & Malaysian Plant Protection Society, Kuala Lumpur. vii + 430p.
 White, I. M. & Elson-Harris, M. (1992). Fruit flies of economic significance: their identification and bionomics. London: International Institute of Entomology. 601 p. 
 Aluja, M. and Liedo, P. (Eds.) (1993). Fruit Flies: Biology and Management. Springer Verlag, New York.
 Calkins, C.O.; Klassen, W.; Liedo, P.(eds.) (1994). Fruit Flies and the Sterile Insect Technique. CRC Press, Boca Raton, Florida. 272 pp. 1994.
 Aluja, M. & Norrbom, A. L. (eds.) (1999). Fruit flies (Tephritidae): phylogeny and evolution of behavior. CRC Press, Boca Raton. [16] + 944 p. 
 Dyck, V.A, J. Hendrichs and A.S. Robinson (Eds) (2005). Sterile Insect Technique. Principles and practice in area-wide integrated pest management. Springer Publisher, The Netherlands

External links 
 TWD Official website 
 Tephritid Workers of Europe Africa and the Middle East (TEAM)
 Tephritid Workers of the Western Hemisphere (TWWH)
 Tephritid Workers of Asia Australia and Oceania region (TAAO)
 Fruit Fly (Diptera: Tephritidae) Taxonomy Pages
 IPC-Fruit Flies webpage
 Pest Fruit Flies of the World
 Tephritidae
 Find Tephritidae News on Facebook
 AREA-WIDE INTEGRATED PEST MANAGEMENT
 Ceratitis capitata host list

Knowledge management
Entomological databases
Tephritidae
Online databases